Xiaoyi Bao  is a Chinese Canadian physicist, recognized for her contributions to the field of fiber optics. She is a professor at the University of Ottawa, where she holds the Canada Research Chair in Fiber Optics and Photonics. Bao was awarded an honorary doctorate from the University of Lethbridge; the citation for the honour called her "a world-renowned scholar in her field."

Biography 
Bao completed bachelor's (1982) and master's degrees (1985) in optics from Nankai University in China. She earned a PhD from the Anhui Institute of Optics and Fine Mechanics, Chinese Academy of Sciences, in 1987. 

Bao was a professor at the University of New Brunswick from 1994 to 2000. In 2000, she joined the Department of Physics at the University of Ottawa. In 2003, she was named a Canada Research Chair in Fibre Optics and Physics.

Bao's areas of research include the development of fiber sensors (e.g., for temperature, strain, pressure, refractive index, and vibration); and the use of nonlinear optical effects (self-phase modulation, cross-phase modulation, four-wave mixing, and stimulated scattering) in fibers to design sensors, instrumentation, lasers, and devices. Sensor systems using Xiaoyi's methods are being used in countries around the world.

In 2015, Bao was awarded an honorary doctorate from the University of Lethbridge; the citation for the honour called her "a world-renowned scholar in her field."

Awards and honours 
 2009: Fellow, Royal Society of Canada 
 2010: Fellow, The Optical Society
 2010: Medal for Outstanding Achievement in Applied Photonics, Canadian Association of Physicists-Institut National d'Optique (CAP-INO)
 2012: Education Foundation Award of Merit, Federation of Chinese Canadian Professionals (Ontario)
 2012: Fellow, International Society for Optics and Photonics
 2013: Medal for Outstanding Achievement in Industrial and Applied Physics, Canadian Association of Physicists (CAP)
 2015: Honorary Doctor of Science, University of Lethbridge

Selected publications

References

External links 
University of Ottawa academic biography
Xiaoyi Bao Group website

Year of birth missing (living people)
Living people
Academic staff of the University of Ottawa
Canadian physicists
Fellows of Optica (society)
Fellows of the Royal Society of Canada
Canadian people of Chinese descent
Women in optics